Totum duplex is the highest rank for an ecclesiastical feast in the Dominican breviary. Other ranks are Duplex, Semiduplex and Simplex.

Respective highest ranks in other breviaries are:

 Roman: Festum duplex
 Cistercian: Festum sermonis majus
 Carmelite: Duplex majus

See also 
Glossary of the Catholic Church

References 
 Ecclesiastical Feasts by the Catholic Encyclopedia

Dominican Order
Dominican spirituality